The Conservatorio Giovanni Battista Martini (previously known as the Liceo Musicale di Bologna, and sometimes referred to in English as the Bologna Conservatory) is a college of music in Bologna, Italy. The conservatory opened on 3 December 1804, as the Liceo Musicale di Bologna. It was initially housed in the convent at the Basilica of San Giacomo Maggiore. The first faculty at the school included the composers Stanislao Mattei and Giovanni Callisto Zanotti, and the composer and singer Lorenzo Gibelli. Gioachino Rossini was a pupil at the school beginning in 1806, and was appointed head of the school in 1839. Later directors of the school included Luigi Mancinelli (1881-1886), Giuseppe Martucci (1886-1902), Marco Enrico Bossi (1902-1911), and Cesare Nordio (1925-1945).

In 1945, the conservatory became a state conservatory, and it was rebranded as the Conservatorio Giovanni Battista Martini, after musician and composer Giovanni Battista Martini. Directors of the conservatory from this point on include Guido Guerrini, Lino Liviabella, Adone Zecchi, Giordano Noferini, Lidia Proietti, Carmine Carrisi, and Donatella Pieri.

Notable alumni

Marietta Alboni
Alice Barbi
Gianni Bedori
Chiara Benati
Giacomo Benvenuti
Marco Enrico Bossi
Claudio Brizi
Piero Buscaroli
Luciano Chessa
Giuliano Ciannella
Ettore Campogalliani
Giulio Confalonieri
Franco Donatoni
Gaetano Donizetti
Enrico Elisi
Mafalda Favero
Franco Ferrara
Rodolfo Ferrari
Carlo Forlivesi
Gaetano Gaspari
Giorgio Federico Ghedini
Júlíus Vífill Ingvarsson
Gian Francesco Malipiero
Gianfranco Masini
Giacomo Orefice
Luigi Piazza
Ciro Pinsuti
Ezio Pinza
Claudia Pinza Bozzolla
Manuel Ponce
Ottorino Respighi
Andrea Roncato
Gioachino Rossini
Albert Spalding
 Enea Scala
Riccardo Stracciari
Giovanni Tadolini
Luigi Ferdinando Tagliavini
Fabio Vacchi
Celso Valli
Franco Venturini
Manuel Viscasillas Bernal
Corrado Zambelli
Fio Zanotti

Notable faculty

Marcello Abbado
Cesare Augusto
Nazario Carlo Bellandi
Alessandro Busi
Ettore Desderi
Benedetto Donelli
Ines Maria Ferraris 
Gian Felice Fugazza
Gaetano Gaspari
Stefano Golinelli
Adriano Guarnieri
Leone Magiera
Luigi Mancinelli
Giacomo Manzoni
Giuseppe Martucci
Antonio Melandri
Luigi Mostacci
Riccardo Nielsen
Umberto Pineschi
Paolo Ravaglia
Paolo Renosto
Gioachino Rossini
Alessandro Solbiati
Alessandro Vezzani

See also
Accademia Filarmonica di Bologna
Museo internazionale e biblioteca della musica

References

Sources
Allitt, John Stewart (1991), Donizetti – in the light of romanticism and the teaching of Johann Simon Mayr, Shaftesbury, Dorset, UK: Element Books. Also see Allitt's website

External links
Official Website of Conservatorio Giovanni Battista Martini

 
Music schools in Italy
Culture in Bologna
1804 establishments in Italy
Educational institutions established in 1804